The Stornoway Gazette is a local newspaper reporting on local issues in the Western Isles of Scotland, specifically Stornoway and the Outer Hebrides.

In 2004, nine months of head-to-head competition with a rival title ended with The Hebridean ceasing publication. Following this, the Gazette acquired the title and the publication rights to The Hebridean.

Johnston Press, the Edinburgh-based newspaper group, became the owner of the paper in 2004 when they bought Score Press, which had been a division of Scottish Radio Holdings.

In 2013, when the Gazette was 96 years old, it was decided that it would relaunch as a compact.

It was awarded 2013 Newspaper of the Year at the annual Highlands and Islands Media Awards.

References

External links 
Website of the Stornoway Gazette

Newspapers published in Scotland
Mass media in the Outer Hebrides
Newspapers published by Johnston Press